The natural history of the island of Rhodes is determined by its geographic position, climate and geological diversity. Rhodes is in the Eastern Mediterranean Basin close to the coast of Turkey, and the flora and fauna are a mixture of Mediterranean and Asian elements. Rhodes is in the Eastern Mediterranean conifer-sclerophyllous-broadleaf forests ecoregion.

The habitats are: arable land; perennial crops, orchards and groves, ruderal land; coastline and coastal rocky areas, inland cliffs, sea cliffs and rocky shores: forest, native coniferous woodland; grassland steppes and dry calcareous grassland; shrub land, sclerophyllous scrub, garrigue and maquis shrubland; wetland, rivers and streams.

Flowering plants
The flowering plant species of Rhodes number 1,243.

Phrygana or spiny garrigue

Phrygana or garrigue is open dwarf scrub dominated by low, often cushion-shaped, spiny shrubs. The phryganic species are high-temperature and drought tolerant, and they grow at low altitudes, usually on poor and rocky limestone and siliceous substrates.

The most common phryganic species on Rhodes are: 
 
 Sarcopoterium spinosum
 Cistus incanus
 Cistus salviifolius
 Phlomis fruticosa
 Salvia triloba
 Quercus coccifera
 Asparagus acutifolius
 Genista acanthoclada
 Euphorbia acanthothamnos 
 Pistacia lentiscus

Other species include 
 
 Coridothymus capitatus
 Thymus sp.
 Hypericum empetrifolium
 Salvia triloba
 Erica manipuliflora
 Calicotome villosa
 Ballota acetabulosa
 Asphodelus aestivus

Bulbous plants
Many bulbous plants on Rhodes flower in the month of October. Species include:
 
Sternbergia lutea
 Colchicum cupanii
 Cyclamen graecum
 Drimia maritima (late summer) 
 Narcissus serotinus. 

Notable are:
 
 Colchicum macrophyllum
 Fritillaria rhodia
 Tulipa saxatilis

Orchids
Rhodes has a high diversity of orchid species, especially in the genus Ophrys: 
 
 Ophrys apifera
 Ophrys bombyliflora
 Ophrys ciliata
 Ophrys regis-ferdinandii
 Ophrys cretica
 Ophrys ferrum-equinum
 Ophrys mammosa
 Ophrys lutea
 Ophrys sicula
 Ophrys reinholdii
 Ophrys tenthredinifera
 Ophrys umbilicata
 Ophrys umbilicata
 Ophrys fusca
 Ophrys omegaifera
 Ophrys iricolor
 Ophrys candica
 Ophrys holosericea
 Ophrys heldreichii
 Ophrys dodekanensis
 Ophrys oestrifera
 Ophrys speculum
 Serapias bergonii
 Serapias carica
 Serapias parviflora
 Himantoglossum comperianum
 Himantoglossum robertianum (= Barlia robertiana)
 Anacamptis collina
 Anacamptis laxiflora
 Anacamptis morio
 Anacamptis papilionacea
 Anacamptis pyramidalis
 Anacamptis sancta
Anacamptis fragrans
 Anacamptis palustris
 Anacamptis coriophora
 Orchis anatolica
 Orchis anthropophora
 Orchis italica
 Orchis provincialis
 Orchis punctulata
 Orchis simia
 Orchis lactea
 Neotinea intacta
 Neotinea lactea
 Dactylorhiza romana
 Spiranthes spiralis
 Limodorum abortivum
 Cephalanthera epipactoides
 Cephalanthera longifolia 
 Neotinea maculata

Other plants

Among the Mediterranean endemic species prominent in the Rhodes vegetation are:
 
 Aleppo pine
 stone pine
 Mediterranean cypress
 bay laurel
 Oriental sweetgum
 holm oak
 kermes oak
 strawberry tree
 Greek strawberry tree
 mastic
 terebinth
 common myrtle
 oleander
 Acanthus mollis
 Vitex agnus-castus
 Valerianella coronata

Nearly endemic to the Mediterranean genera found on Rhodes are: 
 
 Aubrieta
 Sesamoides
 Cynara
 Dracunculus
 Arisarum 
 Biarum

More widespread in South-east Europe and Asia Minor plants include 
 
 Ranunculus asiaticus
 Tamarix parviflora
 Petrorhagia dubia
 Heliotropium europaeum
 Centranthus calcitrapae and Globularia alypum

Widely-grown introduced plants
Widely introduced plants include:
 
 Bougainvillea
 Acacia
 Agave
 Artemisia
 Calendula
 Clematis
 Eucalyptus
 Fuchsia
 Hydrangea
 Impatiens
 Jacaranda
 Jasmine
 Magnolia
 Melissa
 Pelargonium
 Salvia

Birds
257 bird species are recorded from Rhodes, many are passage migrants. 80 are breeding species.

Breeding species include: 
 
 Alectoris chukar
 Burhinus oedicnemus
 Otus scops
 Apus melba
 Apus pallidus
 Merops apiaster
 Upupa epops
 Calandrella brachydactyla
 Hirundo daurica
 Anthus campestris
 Cercotrichas galactotes
 Oenanthe hispanica
 Gulosus aristotelis
 Ixobrychus minutus
 Buteo rufinus
 Hieraaetus fasciatus
 Circaetus gallicus
 Falco naumanni
 Falco eleonorae
 Falco peregrinus
 Falco biarmicus
 Aquila chrysaetos
 Clamator glandarius
 Melanocorypha calandra
 Acrocephalus melanopogon
 Phylloscopus bonelli
 Sitta neumayer
 Oriolus oriolus
 Corvus corax
 Emberiza hortulana
 Emberiza caesia
 Emberiza melanocephala
 Lanius collurio
 Hippolais olivetorum
 Sylvia ruppeli
 Saxicola rubetra

Passage migrants include: 
 
Nycticorax nycticorax
 Ardeola ralloides
 Ardea purpurea
 Plegadis falcinellus
 Pandion haliaetus
 Falco vespertinus
 Milvus migrans
 Circus pygargus
 Hieraaetus pennatus
 Himantopus himantopus
 Glareola pratincola
 Calidris temminckii
 Tringa stagnatilis
 Larus audouinii
 Gelochelidon nilotica
 Chlidonias leucopterus
 Chlidonias hybridus
 Coracias garrulus
 Anthus cervinus
 Plegadis falcinellus
 Oenanthe isabellina 
 Oenanthe pleschanka

Vagrant birds (many from nearby Turkey) include Circus macrourus, Charadrius leschenaultii, Apus affinis, Luscinia luscinia, Merops persicus, Ficedula semitorquata, Oenanthe cypriaca, Sturnus roseus, Hoplopterus spinosus, Emberiza rustica, Chettusia gregaria, Bubulcus ibis, Anthropoides virgo, Passer moabiticus and very many others.

winter visitors on Rhodes include: Melanocorypha calandra and Acrocephalus melanopogon.

Mammals
There are 33 species: Cervidae Dama dama; Erinaceidae Erinaceus concolor, Erinaceus roumanicus; Leporidae Lepus europaeus, Oryctolagus cuniculus; Molossidae Tadarida teniotis; Muridae Apodemus flavicollis, Apodemus mystacinus, Apodemus sylvaticus, Mus domesticus, Rattus rattus; Mustelidae Martes foina, Meles meles; Phocidae Monachus monachus; Rhinolophidae Rhinolophus blasii, Rhinolophus euryale, Rhinolophus ferrumequinum, Rhinolophus hipposideros; Soricidae Crocidura suaveolens, Suncus etruscus; Vespertilionidae Eptesicus bottae, Hypsugo savii, Miniopterus schreibersii, Myotis blythii, Myotis emarginatus, Myotis myotis, Pipistrellus kuhlii, Pipistrellus pipistrellus, Plecotus austriacus.

Amphibia
Rhodes has 3 species: Bufo viridis, Hyla arborea and Rana cerigensis.

Reptiles

There are 24 species of reptile certainly found on Rhodes. These are: Amphisbaenidae, Blanus strauchi; Cheloniidae, Caretta caretta;Geoemydidae Mauremys rivulata; Colubridae, Platyceps najadum, Coluber caspius, Coluber gemonensis, Coluber nummifer, Elaphe situla, Natrix natrix, Natrix tessellata, Telescopus fallax; Dermochelyidae, Dermochelys coriacea; Lacertidae, Podarcis erhardii,Anatololacerta oertzeni, Ophisops elegans Lacerta trilineata; Scincidae, Ablepharus kitaibelii, Chalcides ocellatus, Euprepis auratus ; Typhlopidae, Typhlops vermicularis; Viperidae, Vipera xanthina; Agamidae, Laudakia stellio; Gekkonidae, Hemidactylus turcicus and Mediodactylus kotschyi.

Species uncertainly recorded include a further 8: Eryx jaculus, Eirenis modestus, Malpolon monspessulanus, Natrix tessellata, Vipera xanthina, Chamaeleo chamaeleon, Testudo graeca and Testudo hermanni.

Fish
See List of fish of the Mediterranean Sea.
Squalius ghigii is endemic to Rhodes.

Insects
2,652 insect species/subspecies are recorded from Rhodes.
Commonly seen insects in Rhodes are the sail swallowtail, the scarlet dragonfly, Cleopatra butterfly, European praying mantis, cicada, glow-worm, hummingbird hawk-moth, firebug, field cricket, European tree cricket, European hornet, cuckoo wasp, carpenter bee and the rose chafer.

Land and freshwater mollusca
178 land and freshwater mollusca species/subspecies are recorded from Rhodes.

Other terrestrial invertebrates
The freshwater crab Potamon potamios is found on Rhodes. It is common at Petaloudes.

Marine fauna

Characteristic habitat types of the Rhodes Mediterranean/Aegean coastal zone, are the Cystoseira biocenosis and the Posidonia oceanica seagrass beds, Lithophyllum lichenoides communities form coralligenous reefs which are a spectacular sight; the coralline alga is covered with large gorgonian fans, coral, and a diverse array of often colourful invertebrate organisms and hundreds of species of fish.

These communities host sponges (Porifera), sea anemones, jellyfish (Cnidaria), sea mats and hornwrack (Bryozoa), segmented worms (Annelida) snails, bivalves, squids and octopuses (Mollusca), starfishes and sea urchins (Echinodermata), crabs, lobsters and shrimps (Arthropoda) and little known groups such as Echiura, Priapulida, Sipuncula, Brachiopoda, Pogonophora, Phoronida and Hemichordata.

Amongst the thousand or so species of invertebrates found in the Rhodes Mediterranean/Aegean coastal zone marine environment are mantis shrimps, Mediterranean slipper lobsters, octopus, cuttlefish, scribbled nudibranch, Hypselodoris picta, tasselled nudibranch, precious coral, zigzag coral, purple sail, Mediterranean jellyfish, spiny spider crab, circular crab, broad-clawed porcelain crab, noble pen shell, pilgrim’s scallop, ragged sea hare, violet sea hare, Portuguese man o' war, black sea urchin, purple sea-urchin, long-spine slate pen sea urchin, Mediterranean starfish, sea mouse, Barbatia barbata and Parazoanthus axinellae.

Museums

There is a marine natural history display at the Aquarium of Rhodes together with a display of living Mediterranean fish and other marine creatures. A second natural history display at Petaloudes is devoted to the mammals, birds, reptiles, insects, plants and geology of Rhodes. A more specialised museum devoted to bee keeping is close to Rhodes city).

.

Conservation
Greece is a signatory to the Berne Convention on the Conservation of European Wildlife and Natural Habitats and the Habitats Directive both affording protection to the fauna and flora of Rhodes.

References
Flora
Flora Europaea
Vangelis Papiomytoglou, 2006 Wild Flowers of Greece Mediterraneo Editions 
Panitsa, Maria, Britt Snogerup, Sven Snogerup & Dimitrios Tzanoudakis, 2003. Floristic investigation of Lemnos island (NE Aegean area, Greece). - Willdenowia 33: 79 - 105. 

Orchids

Kretzschmar, H. and G., 2004 Orchids - Crete and Dodecanese Mediterraneo Editions, Greece 
 Kreutz, C. A. J., 2002 Die Orchideen von Rhodos und Karpathos : Beschreibung, Lebensweise, Verbreitung, Gefährdung, Schutz und Ikonographie ( the orchids of Rhodes and Karpathos : description, pattern of life, distribution, threat, conservation and iconography) Seckel & Kreutz Publishers. 
Zissis Antonopoulos, 2009 The Bee Orchids of Greece - The genus Ophrys Mediterraneo Editions 
Orchids of Europe includes spring expedition report Frühling auf Rhodos 20. - 30. März 2008 pdf in German

Birds

The Birds of the Western Palearctic and Avibase see External links
The EBCC Atlas of European Breeding Birds

Reptiles
Bader T, Riegler C, Grillitsch H (2009) The herpetofauna of the Island of Rhodes (Dodecanese, Greece).Herpetozoa,Wien; 21 (3/4): 147–169 

Butterflies
Bender, R., 1963 Beitrage zur Lepidopterenfauna der Insel Rhodos Zeitschr. wiener e.nt. Ges., vo1. 48: pp. 11-20, 2 pls. 1963. Review of previous studies& annotated list of 150 macros from Rhodes. Figures races of Gonepteryx cleopatra (in colour), Maniola telmessia ornata, & Glaucopsyche alexis insulicola. In German.
Kudrna, O. 2002. The Distribution Atlas of European Butterflies. Oedippus, Nr. 20.
Kudrna, O., Harpke, A., Lux, K., Pennerstorfer, J., Schweiger, O.,Settele, J. & Wiemers, M., 2011. Distribution Atlas of Butterflies in Europe. GfS, Halle, Germany. 576 pp.
Van Swaay, C., Cuttelod., A., Collins, S., Maes, D., López Munguira, M., Šašiæ, M., Settele, J., Verovnik, R., Verstrael, T., Warren, M., Wiemers, M. and Wynhoff, I., 2010. European Red List of Butterflies.

Mollusca

Frank C., 1997. Die Molluskenfauna der Insel Rhodos, 2. Teil. Stapfia, 48: 1–179.
Maassen, W.J.M., 1981. De Molluskenfauna van het griekseeiland Rhodos. De Kreukel, 17: 21–32.
Paget O.E., 1976. Die Molluskenfauna der Insel Rhodos. 1.Teil. Annalen des Naturhistorischen Museums in Wien 80:681–780.
Barna Páll-Gergely and Zoltán Csabai, 2008. Notes on the continental malacofauna of Rhodes, with two new species for the fauna of the island Malacologia Bohemoslovaca 7: 76–78 
Fauna Europaea

Insects

Fauna Europaea

Marine life

Noelle and Dinos Simeonidis, 2010 Life in the Greek seas and the Mediterranean Mediterraneo Editions 
Repetto, G.; Orlando, F. & Arduino, G. 2005. Conchiglie del Mediterraneo. 1770 Specie Illustrate con Distribuzione e Frequenza. Amici del Museo Federico Eusebio, Alba. 392 pp.

External links
WWF Southeastern Europe
Hellenic Zoological Society
Fauna of Dodecanese lists via search on Fauna Europaea

Birds
Avibase
EBBC Atlas
Birdwatching report May,2005

Flora
Michael HasslerUniversity of Karlsruhe
EU-Nomen Pan-European Species Directories Infrastructure To access the East Aegean list go to advanced search > occurrence then select East Aegean from the menu
Mediterranean plants identification University of Reading
Orchids of Rhodes
East Mediterranean Ecosystems

Natura Mediterraneo
naturamediterraneo Forum. Many images In Italian

Rhodes
Rhodes